The Magnolia Springs Historic District, in  Magnolia Springs, Alabama, is a  historic district which was listed on the National Register of Historic Places in 2012.

A previous district of the same name had existed as an entity of Baldwin County, but it was legally dissolved by the incorporation of Magnolia Springs.

The district runs roughly along Oak, Spring, Bay, Jessamine, Magnolia, Pine & Rock Sts., Island, Cedar & Holly Aves. & Magnolia Springs Highway.  It includes 70 contributing buildings, a contributing structure, and a contributing site (the spring), as well as 47 non-contributing resources.

The district was deemed significant "for its role as a resort community that, in the late 19th and early to mid 20th
centuries, served both transient visitors as well as part-time and permanent residents who were predominantly
affluent Northerners."

Included are:
Brunell House, 12113 Jessamine St., separately-NRHP-listed, a vernacular rental cottage with elements of Classical Revival style, including Tuscan columns.
Governor's Club, separately-NRHP-listed
Moore Brothers General Store (c.1925), 14770 Oak St., separately-NRHP-listed
Magnolia Springs Community Hall (1896), Oak Street, across from the Moore Store
St. Paul's Episcopal Church, Oak Ave, separately-NRHP-listed
Sunnyside Hotel, 14469 Oak St., separately-NRHP-listed

References

External links

National Register of Historic Places in Baldwin County, Alabama
Historic districts on the National Register of Historic Places in Alabama